Kostadin Slaev (Bulgarian: Костадин Слаев; born 2 October 1989) is a Bulgarian footballer who plays as a left back for Bansko.

Career

Vereya
After six seasons in B Group with Bansko Slaev moved to the newly promoted to First League team Vereya. He made his debut for the team on 30 July 2016 in a match against Dunav Ruse.

CSKA 1948
On 14 June 2018, Slaev signed with the newly promoted to Second League CSKA 1948.

Career statistics

Club

References

External links
 

1989 births
Living people
Footballers from Plovdiv
Bulgarian footballers
FC Bansko players
FC Vereya players
FC CSKA 1948 Sofia players
First Professional Football League (Bulgaria) players
Association football fullbacks